Pleomassaria is a genus of fungi in the family Pleomassariaceae. This is a monotypic genus, containing the single species Pleomassaria siparia.

Its genome has been sequenced

References

Pleosporales
Monotypic Dothideomycetes genera